Holocaust trivialization is any comparison or analogy that diminishes the impact of the Holocaust, the Nazi genocide of six million European Jews during World War II. The Wiesel Commission defined trivialization as the abusive use of comparisons with the aim of minimizing the Holocaust and banalizing its atrocities. Originally, holocaust meant a type of sacrifice that is completely burnt to ashes; starting from the late 19th century, it started to denote an extensive destruction of a group, usually people or animals. The 1915 Armenian genocide was described as a "holocaust" by contemporary observers.

Manfred Gerstenfeld identifies trivialization of the Holocaust as one of eleven forms of Holocaust distortion; he defines Holocaust trivialization as the application of language that is specific to describing the Holocaust to events and purposes that are unrelated to it. According to David Rudrum, examples of Holocaust trivialization include Lord Wigley invoking Auschwitz to oppose nuclear weapons and Al Gore citing Kristallnacht in defence of the environment.

In the words of Holocaust survivor and memoirist Elie Wiesel, "I cannot use [the word 'Holocaust'] anymore. First, because there are no words, and also because it has become so trivialized that I cannot use it anymore. Whatever mishap occurs now, they call it 'holocaust.' I have seen it myself in television in the country in which I live. A commentator describing the defeat of a sports team, somewhere, called it a 'holocaust.' I have read in a very prestigious newspaper published in California, a description of the murder of six people, and the author called it a holocaust. So, I have no words anymore."

Notable cases

Historikerstreit 

During the Historikerstreit, many scholars believed the position taken in the Holocaust uniqueness debate by conservative intellectuals led by Ernst Nolte – namely that the Holocaust was not unique, Germans should not bear any special burden of guilt for the "Final Solution to the Jewish Question", there was no moral difference between the crimes of the Soviet Union and those of Nazi Germany, as the Nazis acted as they did out of fear of what the Soviet Union might do to Germany, or that the Holocaust itself was a reaction to the Bolshevik Revolution and the Soviet Union—trivialized the Holocaust, and echoed Nazi propaganda.

Historian Thomas Kühne writes that "[t]he more provocative historians were in doing so and the more they thereby questioned the uniqueness, or the peculiarity, of the Holocaust, the more their work was met with resistance or even disgust, most prominently and controversially the German Ernst Nolte in the 1980s."

Israeli–Palestinian conflict 

Comparing the State of Israel to Nazis, or the plight of Palestinians to that of Jews under Nazi occupation, has been criticized as trivializing the Holocaust or antisemitic. The Anti-Defamation League (ADL) accused Gilad Atzmon of trivializing and distorting the Holocaust specifically in the context of the Israeli–Palestinian conflict. According to the ADL, Atzmon invoked the word Shoah to describe Israel's treatment of the Palestinians, among other abuses.

The Centre for Israel and Jewish Affairs (CIJA) condemned the United Church of Canada for trivializing the Holocaust. According to the CIJA, the United Church of Canada published a document in which they placed a statement decrying the "loss of dignity" on the part of the Palestinians, attributed to Israel, promptly after a similar statement acknowledging "the denial of human dignity to Jews" in the Holocaust.

During a visit to Berlin, Palestinian President Mahmoud Abbas told Olaf Scholz that "Israel [had] committed….50 massacres, 50 slaughters, 50 holocausts" after he was inquired if he would apologize for the Munich massacre by Palestinian terrorists. Scholz stated in a message to the Bild newspaper that "for us Germans, any relativization of the Holocaust is unbearable and unacceptable."

Post-Communist states and Holocaust memory 

According to political scientist Jelena Subotić, the Holocaust memory was hijacked in post-Communist states in an attempt to erase fascist crimes and local participation to the Holocaust, and use their imagery to represent real or imagined crimes of Communist states. Subotić discussed specifically examples in Croatia and Serbia, but governments across the region "have used public monuments, museums, and memorials to nationally appropriate the memory of the Holocaust, and use it to produce a new visual remembrance of their 20th Century past that supports their myths of nationhood." According to Subotić, this form of historical revisionism of the Holocaust and post-Communist memory "has become so mainstream and state sponsored that in 2018 Croatian president Kolinda Grabar Kitarovic called for the creation of an international commission to determine the truth about the camp between 1941 and 1945, 'but also after' – indicating that the narrative that Jasenovac was a communist camp after the war was now accepted at the pinnacle of power."

A report by the Wiesel Commission criticized the comparison of Gulag victims with Jewish Holocaust victims, as was done in The Black Book of Communism, as an attempt at Holocaust trivialization. The Historical Museum of Serbia put on the highly-publicized exhibition "In the Name of the People – Political Repression in Serbia 1944–1953", which according to Subotić "promised to display new historical documents and evidence of communist crimes, ranging from assassinations, kidnappings and detentions in camps to collectivisation, political trials and repression" to actually show "random and completely decontextualised photographs of 'victims of communism', which included innocent people but also many proven fascist collaborators, members of the quisling government, right-wing militias, and the Axis-allied Chetnik movement." Another, more damning example is the well-known photograph of prisoners from the Buchenwald concentration camp, which was displayed in the section devoted to a Communist-era camp for political prisoners on the Adriatic island of Goli Otok, describing it as "the example of living conditions of Goli Otok prisoners", and not correcting it even after the misrepresentation was exposed. Only after an outcry from Holocaust historians, a small note was taped underneath the display caption that read: "Prisoners' bunk-beds in the Dachau camp."

In New Directions in the History of the Jews in the Polish Lands (2018), historian Dan Michman laments that "[f]rom the perspective of today, one can say that the pendulum has even moved so far in emphasizing Eastern Europe from June 1941 onward, and first and foremost its killing sites as the locus of the Shoah, that one will find recent studies which entirely marginalize or even disregard the importance to the Holocaust of such essential issues as the 1930s in Germany and Austria; the persecution and murder of Western and Southern European Jewry; first steps of persecution in Tunisia and Libya; and other aspects of the Holocaust such as the enormous spoliation and the cultural warfare aimed at exorcising the jüdische Geist."

Double genocide theory 

The double genocide narrative holds that there were two contemporary genocides of equal weight, a Nazi one and a Stalinist one. Michael Shafir calls the double genocide theory a form of Holocaust obfuscation, while Carole Lemée sees it as a symptom of persistent antisemitism.

In The Holocaust/Genocide Template in Eastern Europe, Ljiljana Radonić writes that the double genocide theory proposes the existence of an equivalency between communism and Nazism. Radonić posits that this theory and charges of Communist genocide both come from "a stable of anti-communist émigré lexicon since the 1950s and more recently revisionist politicians and scholars" as well as the "comparative trivialization" of the Holocaust that "results from tossing postwar killings of suspected Axis collaborators and opponents of Tito's regime into the same conceptual framework as the Nazi murder of six million of Jews", describing this as "an effort to demonize communism more broadly as an ideology akin to Nazism."

Red holocaust 

The term red Holocaust was coined by the Institute of Contemporary History (Munich Institut für Zeitgeschichte) at Munich. According to German historian , this term is not popular among scholars in Germany or internationally. Alexandra Laignel-Lavastine writes that usage of this term "allows the reality it describes to immediately attain, in the Western mind, a status equal to that of the extermination of the Jews by the Nazi regime." Michael Shafir says that the use of the term supports the "competitive martyrdom component" of the double genocide theory. George Voicu states that Leon Volovici has "rightfully condemned the abusive use of this concept as an attempt to 'usurp' and undermine a symbol specific to the history of European Jews."

In "Secondary Anti-Semitism: From Hard-Core to Soft-Core Denial of the Shoah", German political scientist  writes: "Contrary to the hard-core version, soft-core denial is often not easily identifiable. Often it is tolerated, or even encouraged and reproduced in the mainstream, not only in Germany. Scholars have only recently begun to unravel this disturbing phenomenon. Manfred Gerstenfeld discusses Holocaust trivialization in an article published in 2008. In Germany in 2007 two scholars, Thorsten Eitz and Georg Stötzel, published a voluminous dictionary of German language and discourse regarding National Socialism and the Holocaust. It includes chapters on Holocaust trivialization and contrived comparisons, such as the infamous 'atomic Holocaust', 'Babycaust,' 'Holocaust of abortion', 'red Holocaust' or 'biological Holocaust.'"

Social media 
Some trends on social media platforms have trivialized the Holocaust. In 2020, teenagers posted on TikTok videos of themselves dressed in Holocaust themed fancy dress, and TikTok banned the hashtag Holocaustchallenge.

Soviet and Ukrainian Holocaust 

According to Elazar Barkan, Elizabeth A. Cole and Kai Struve, there is a competition among victims in constructing a "Ukrainian Holocaust". They say that since the 1990s the term Holodomor has been adopted by anti-communists because of its similarity to the Holocaust in an attempt to promote the narrative that the Soviet Communists killed 10 million Ukrainians, but the Nazis killed only 6 million Jews. They further posit that the term Holodomor was "introduced and popularized by the Ukrainian diaspora in North America before Ukraine became independent", and that "the term 'Holocaust' is not explained at all". It has been used to create a "victimized national narrative" and "compete with the Jewish narrative in order to obscure the 'dark sides' of Ukraine's national history and to counter accusations that their fathers collaborated with the Germans".

American investigative journalist Jeff Coplon posits that there is a fascist or far-right link in positing the famine as Soviet genocide and holocaust. Robert Conquest's The Harvest of Sorrow popularized the view that the Soviet famine of 1932–1933, particularly that in Ukraine in the same period, was a genocide against Ukrainians. According to Coplon, "In the latest catalogue for the Noontide Press, a Liberty Lobby affiliate run by flamboyant fascist Willis Carto, The Harvest of Sorrow is listed cheek-by-jowl with such revisionist tomes as The Auschwitz Myth and Hitler At My Side. To hype the Conquest book and its terror-famine, the catalogue notes: 'The act of genocide against the Ukrainian people has been suppressed  until recently, perhaps because a real 'Holocaust' might compete with a Holo-hoax.' With the term 'Holo-hoax' referring to the Nazi slaughter of six million Jews."

Coplon reports opinions of expert Sovietologists, such as the father of modern Sovietology Alexander Dallin of Stanford University, Moshe Lewin of the University of Pennsylvania, whose Russian Peasants and the Soviet Power was groundbreaking in social history, Lynne Viola of SUNY-Binghamton, the first historian from the United States to examine Moscow's Central State Archive on Soviet collectivization, and veteran Sovietologist Roberta Manning of Boston College, as rejecting "Conquest's hunt for a new holocaust". Eli Rosenbaum, who was general counsel for the World Jewish Congress and former director of the Office of Special Investigations (United States Department of Justice), observed that "they're always looking to come up with a number bigger than six million. It makes the reader think: 'My god it's worse than the Holocaust.'"

Invasion of Ukraine 

Yad Vashem (Israel's official memorial to the Jewish victims of the Holocaust) criticized the Kremlin's claim that the Russian invasion of Ukraine was aimed at the "denazification" of Ukraine, as false and a trivialization of Holocaust history. According to philosopher Jason Stanley, this reflects an antisemitic conspiracy theory which casts Russian Christians, rather than Jews, as the true victims of Nazi Germany. The Fortunoff Archive for Holocaust Testimonies also condemned the invasion and described Putin's rhetoric as Holocaust trivialization, and the US Holocaust Memorial Museum denounced Putin's abuse of Holocaust history.

On 21 March 2022, Ukrainian president Volodymyr Zelensky was criticized by  Yad Vashem Holocaust Memorial Center for creating false equivalence between Russian invasion and Holocaust, while Israeli Prime Minister Naftali Bennett found the comparison of the two events to be inappropriate.

See also 

 The Holocaust Industry
 Holocaust inversion
 Is the Holocaust Unique?

References

Further reading 
 Blutinger, Jeffrey (Fall 2010). "An Inconvenient Past: Post-Communist Holocaust Memorialization". Shofar. Purdue University Press. 29 (1): 73–94. .
 Gerstenfeld, Manfred (9 April 2008). "Holocaust Trivialization". Jerusalem Center for Public Affairs.
 Katz, Steven (1994). The Holocaust in Historical Context. Oxford: Oxford University Press. .
 Shafir, Michael (2002). "Between Denial and 'Comparative Trivialization' – Holocaust Negationism in Post-Communist East Central Europe". Acta – Analysis of Current Trends in Antisemitism. Jerusalem: Hebrew University, Vidal Sassoon International Center for the Study of Antisemitism. 19. p. 23.
 Stannard, David E. (2 August 1996). "The dangers of calling the Holocaust unique". The Chronicle of Higher Education. Retrieved 10 January 2022.
 Sullam Calimani, Anna-Vera (October 1999). "A Name for Extermination". The Modern Language Review. 94 (4): 978–999. . .

External links 
 "Addressing Anti-Semitism through Education: Addressing Holocaust Denial, Distortion and Trivialization, Teaching Aid 6" (PDF). OSCE. 4 December 2019.
 "Antisemitism and Hate in Canada". League for Human Rights of Canada. March 2000. . Retrieved 2 December 2020.

Historical controversies
Holocaust denial
Trivialization
Political science terminology